Cedar Valley is a settlement in Saint John Parish, Antigua and Barbuda.

The town has a golf course and is home to the Cedar Valley Golf Club.

History

Cedar Valley Plantation 
Three DuBuissons (James Memoth DuBuisson, Mrs. Edith Manus Dubuisson, and William Herman DuBuisson), as well as Alexander Moody-Stuart and Judith Gwendolyn Moody-Stuart, received 18,000 shares in the Antigua Sugar Estates for £1 each in 1940. As George Moody-Stuart was offered shares but turned them down, this denoted the final generational transition. Together with Cedar Valley, the following estates would be under the authority of the new corporation: Gunthorpe's (#64), Cassada Garden (#13), Paynter's (#61), Tomlinson's (#17), Fitches Creek (#67), Donovan's (#65), North Sound (#66), Galley Bay (#30), and Five Islands (#31).

The Lands of Antigua & Barbuda Sugar Factory Limited and the Antigua & Barbuda Syndicate Estates Limited (Vesting) Act were passed by the Antiguan government the same year, and they stated that "all piece or parcel of land forming part of Cedar Valley, approximately 240.225 acres as contained in Certificate of Title No. 1111940 dated 26th April, 1940 and registered in Register Book P Folio 11" fell under their purview.

According to a Certificate of Title with the number 1111940 issued April 26th, 1940, the Cedar Valley's lands totaled 240.2 acres. Folio 11 of Register Book P. Gunthorpes Estates, Ltd., was reorganized on August 1 into a new business and given the name Antigua Syndicate Estates, Ltd. (see Gunthorpes (#64)). Cassada Garden, Cedar Valley, Fitches Creek, and North Sound, the original company's holdings, were purchased for £30,700, and Delaps (#137) was acquired for £7,734.

Demographics 
Cedar Valley has 2 enumeration districts.

 31701  Cedar Valley-Longford 
 31702  Cedar Valley

Census Data 
Source:

References 

Populated places in Antigua and Barbuda
Saint John Parish, Antigua and Barbuda